Mata ng Agila is a Philippine television news broadcasting show broadcast by Net 25. Originally anchored by Ely Saludar, Weng Dela Fuente and Sam Cepeda, it premiered on October 24, 2011, replacing I-Balita on the network's evening line up. Emma Tiglao and Alex Santos, currently serve as the anchors.

The program is streaming online on YouTube.

On January 31, 2022, the program updated its theme song.

Anchors

 Emma Tiglao 
 Alex Santos

Former anchors
 Weng dela Fuente 
 Pia Okut-Galang 
 Sam Cepeda 
 Judith Llamera 
 Ely Saludar 
 Vic De Leon Lima 
 Rikki Mathay

Former segment anchors
 Gel Miranda 
 Ben Bernaldez 
 Phoebe Publico 
 Andrea Mendres 
 Cess Alvarez

Interim anchors
 Earlo Bringas 
 Olivia Naguit-Figueroa 
 Judith Llamera 
 Wej Cudiamat 
 Marie Ochoa 
 Mylene Mariano-Rivera 
 Toni Aquino 
 Apple David 
 Nelson Lubao 
 Weng dela Fuente 
 Nina Ricci Alagao-Flores 
 CJ Hirro

Mata ng Agila International
Originally anchored by CJ Hirro and Nina Ricci Alagao-Flores, The late-night, English-language edition of Mata ng Agila premiered on April 4, 2022, on the network's evening line up replacing the weeknight edition of Eagle News International. Nina Ricci Alagao-Flores and Rikki Mathay, currently serve as the anchors.

Anchors
 Nina Ricci Alagao-Flores 
 Rikki Mathay

Former anchors
 CJ Hirro

Mata ng Agila Weekend
Originally anchored by Gel Miranda and Orin Miranda, the weekend edition of Mata ng Agila premiered on June 30, 2012, on the network's Saturday and Sunday evening line up. replacing Eagle News Weekend Edition. Wej Cudiamat, currently serves as the anchor.

Anchors
 Wej Cudiamat

Former anchors
 Gel Miranda 
 Onin Miranda 
 Judith Llamera 
 Gerald Rañez 
 Louisa G. Erispe 
 Mar Gabriel

Segments
 #Pasyalan
 Arts & Culture
 Business News
 Balitang Probinsya
 Environment News
 Health News
 Lighter Side
 Liwanagin Natin
 Metro News
 News Abroad
 News Bullets
 News School
 Odd Di 'Ba?
 Police Beat
 Showbiz News
 Sports News
 Sulyap sa Kasaysayan
 Technology News
 Weather News

Defunct

 Answers and Questions
 #Fundemic
 Eagle News Sports
 Entertainment News
 New Normal Learning
 Science and Technology

See also
List of programs broadcast by Net 25

References

Philippine television news shows
2011 Philippine television series debuts
2020s Philippine television series
Filipino-language television shows
Flagship evening news shows
Net 25 original programming
Sign language television shows